The Ben Jobe National Coach of the Year Award is an award given annually to the most outstanding minority men's college basketball head coach in NCAA Division I competition. The award was established in 2010 and is named for head coach Ben Jobe, who coached at numerous historically black colleges but whose longest tenure at one school was 12 years, which he completed at Southern University.

Selection
The award is presented to the coach who has produced the best results from his basketball team under adverse or otherwise difficult conditions. The inaugural winner, Ed Cooley of Fairfield, dealt with numerous injuries but still managed to lead the Stags to a near-school record 23 wins in 2009–10.

Winners

Winners by school

References

External links
 

College basketball trophies and awards in the United States
Awards established in 2010